Always on My Mind is the 27th studio album by country singer Willie Nelson. It was the Billboard number one country album of the year for 1982, and stayed 253 weeks on the Billboard Top Country Albums charts, peaking at number one for a total of 22 weeks, as well as spending 99 weeks on the Billboard 200 for all albums, peaking at number two for 3 weeks.

Background and recording
During the recording sessions for Nelson's collaboration album with Merle Haggard, Pancho & Lefty, the producer Chips Moman and Bobby Emmons suggested that they record Johnny Christopher's "Always on My Mind". Haggard had no interest in recording a version of the song for the album, so instead Nelson recorded his own version—the first for the album entitled Always on My Mind. In his autobiography, Nelson stated: "We'll never know what would have happened if Merle had really heard the song right. 'Always on My Mind' bowled me over the moment I first heard it, which is one way I pick songs to record".

The rest of the album was constituted by adult-contemporary and pop standards, such as "Do Right Woman, Do Right Man" and Paul Simon's "Bridge Over Troubled Water", as well as re-recordings of his own songs including "Permanently Lonely" (originally recorded for 1969's Good Times LP) and "The Party's Over" (originally recorded for The Party's Over released in 1967).

A 2003 re-release of the album included two bonus tracks: "The Man Who Owes Everyone" and "I'm a Memory" (another re-recording of an earlier release).

2003 re-release bonus tracks

Personnel 
Willie Nelson – guitar, vocals
Gene Chrisman – drums
Johnny Christopher – guitar, backing vocals
Bobby Emmons – keyboards
Mike Leech – bass guitar
John Marett – saxophone
Grady Martin – guitar
Chips Moman – guitar, backing vocals, producer, engineer
Mickey Raphael – harmonica
Gary Talley – vocals 
Toni Wine – keyboards, vocals 
Bobby Wood – keyboards, vocals 
Reggie Young – guitar
Waylon Jennings – vocal (3)
Technical
Virginia Team - art direction
Beverly Parker - photography

Charts

Chart performance

End of year charts

Charting Singles

References

Bibliography

 

1982 albums
Willie Nelson albums
Albums produced by Chips Moman
Columbia Records albums
Covers albums